Akata Witch (retitled What Sunny Saw in the Flames in Nigeria and the UK) is a 2011 fantasy novel written by Nigerian-American author Nnedi Okorafor. It was nominated for the Andre Norton Award and it is the first novel in the Nsibidi Scripts Series, where it is followed by two sequels Akata Warrior and Akata Woman published in 2017 and 2022 respectively.

Background 
Nnedi Okorafor based the novel in Nigerian culture, politics, cosmology, folklore, and tradition to create many of the entities and spirits in the novel.

Plot
Twelve-year-old Sunny Nwazue was born in America yet lives in Nigeria. She is Black and albino, and cannot go out in the sun for long periods because of her albinism.

Sunny discovers that she has magical abilities which makes her a "free agent" in the magical community called the Leopard People in West Africa. As a free agent, she needs to learn about the magical community.  Her magical teachers connect her with three other magical students to become a coven, a group of magical Leopard People assembled to pursue a purpose. The group is cultivated by leaders in the magical communities to try to capture Black Hat Otokoto, a serial killer who also knows magic.

Characters

 Sunny Nwazue is an American-born Nigerian. Aged 12 and albino, Sunny loves to play soccer but is unable to spend long periods in the sun. Because of her pale skin and hair, people call her a witch.
Orlu is Sunny's classmate at school and a "Leopard Person"
Chichi is Orlu's friend who becomes close with Sunny. Chichi can see Sunny's magical abilities better than anyone else.
Sasha is another American-born Nigerian. He was sent to Nigeria by his parents as punishment for using his magic inappropriately.
 Black Hat Otokoto is the main antagonist of the novel. A powerful witch, he targets children for his evil deeds.

Themes 
The novel deals with themes of ethnicity, identity, and dealing with whatever gifts or curses life provides.

Publication history 
The novel was published as What Sunny Saw in the Flames in both Nigeria and the UK; akata has a derogatory meaning in Nigerian dialects. The original edition's title is meant to face and criticize its derogatory meaning.

Reception 
Kirkus Reviews called the novel "ebulliently original." The New York Times recommended it as one of "7 great fantasy novels for teenagers," saying that Okorafor "weaves an enchanting spell in this book and its sequel." The Los Angeles Times said "in an increasingly globalized world, Okorafor's outsider perspective offers a refreshing Afro take on the popular coming-of-age fantasy genre."

Time magazine recognized the book as one of the 100 Best Fantasy Books of All Time, praising Okorafor's use of Nigerian folk beliefs and rituals.

Okorafor's Akata novels have been met with resistance among religious conservatives in Nigeria, who argue that the novels glorify superstition and witchcraft.

Awards 
Akata Witch received the following awards and accolades:

 2019: American Library Association's (ALA) Top Ten Amazing Audiobooks for Young Adults
 2012: Amelia Bloomer Book List 
 2012: ALA Best Fiction for Young Adults
 2011: Nominated for the Andre Norton Nebula Award for Middle Grade and Young Adult Fiction

The novel was also named an Amazon.com best book of the year.

Sequels 
The novel was followed by two sequels; Akata Warrior, released in 2017 and Akata Woman which was released in 2022.

References

External links
Akata Witch series, author's website
 

2011 American novels
American young adult novels
Young adult fantasy novels
Novels set in Nigeria
Novels by Nnedi Okorafor
Nigerian fantasy novels
American fantasy novels
2011 Nigerian novels
Viking Press books